John Werge Hamber (May 6, 1931 – February 1, 2013) was a sailor who represented the United States Virgin Islands. He competed at the 1968 Summer Olympics and the 1972 Summer Olympics.

References

External links
 
 

1931 births
2013 deaths
United States Virgin Islands male sailors (sport)
Olympic sailors of the United States Virgin Islands
Sailors at the 1968 Summer Olympics – Flying Dutchman
Sailors at the 1972 Summer Olympics – Tempest
Sportspeople from Oakland, California